Rujevica can refer to:

 Rujevica, Rijeka, Croatia
 Stadion Rujevica
 Rujevica, Pljevlja, a village in Montenegro
 Rujevica (Sokobanja), a village in Serbia